is a Japanese manga series written and illustrated by Kei Sanbe. The series ran from 2010 to 2012 published by Square Enix and serialized in their Young Gangan magazine. The series has been published in French by Ki-oon under the title Le Berceau des Esprits.

The series focuses on a group of students trapped on a capsized sunken ship at the bottom of the ocean while they fight for survival against an isolated zombie outbreak and try to escape with their lives and sanity intact.

Reception
The manga has a staff rating of 14.5 on the French manga website manga-news.com.

References

Gangan Comics manga
Kei Sanbe
2012 comics endings
Seinen manga